Si'um, also Siium, or Sium (si-u-um, fl. late 3rd millennium BCE) was the 18th Gutian ruler of the Gutian Dynasty of Sumer mentioned on the "Sumerian King List" (SKL). According to the SKL: Si'um was the successor of Yarlaganda. Sium was the last king of the Gutians before Tirigan (likewise according to the SKL).

A tablet is known, dated to c. 2130 BCE, mentioning the allegiance of Lugalanatum prince of Umma to Sium, King of the Gutians.

See also

 History of Sumer
 List of Mesopotamian dynasties

References

22nd-century BC Sumerian kings
Gutian dynasty of Sumer